David Fernley (29 May 1934 – 28 April 2009) was a South African cricketer. He played in eleven first-class matches from 1954/55 to 1963/64.

References

External links
 

1934 births
2009 deaths
South African cricketers
Eastern Province cricketers
Gauteng cricketers
Western Province cricketers
People from Murree